Goyer is a surname. Notable people with the surname include:

 David S. Goyer (born 1965), American film producer, director, and screenwriter
 Jean-Pierre Goyer (born 1932), Canadian lawyer and politician

See also
Goyer Island, an island in the Richelieu River in Carignan, Quebec, Canada